Excite is an American web portal operated by IAC that provides a variety of outsourced content including news and weather, a metasearch engine, and a user homepage. In the United States, the main Excite homepage had long been a personal start page called My Excite. Excite once operated a webmail service commonly known as Excite Mail until August 31, 2021.

The original Excite company was founded in 1994 and went public two years later. Excite was once a popular site on the Internet during the 1990s, with the main portal site Excite.com being the sixth most visited website in 1997. The company merged with broadband provider @Home Network but together went bankrupt in 2001. Excite's portal and services were acquired by iWon and then by Ask Jeeves, but the website went into a steep decline in popularity afterwards.

History 
Excite originally started as Architext in June 1993 at a garage in Cupertino, California, created by Graham Spencer, Joe Kraus, Mark VanHaren, Ryan McIntyre, Ben Lutch and Martin Reinfried, who were all students at Stanford University. The goal was to create software to manage the vast information on the World Wide Web. In July 1994, International Data Group paid them US$80,000 to develop an online service. In January 1995, Vinod Khosla (a former Stanford student), a partner at venture capital firm Kleiner Perkins Caufield & Byers arranged a US$250,000 "first round" backing for the project, with US$1.5 million provided over a ten-month period. Soon thereafter, Geoff Yang, of Institutional Venture Partners, introduced an additional US$1.5 million in financing and Excite was formally launched in October 1995.

In January 1996, George Bell joined Excite as its chief executive officer (CEO). Excite also purchased two search engines (Magellan and WebCrawler) and signed exclusive distribution agreements with Netscape, Microsoft and Apple, in addition to other companies. Jim Bellows, then 72, was hired by Excite in 1994 to figure out how to present the content in a journalistic manner. He paid good journalists to write brief reviews of web sites. However, users wanted to get directly to the content and skipped the reviews, so the partnership with Bellows ended in 1998. Excite's original website design was mostly based on the orange color. In 1997 it was redesigned with a black and yellow theme, which mostly continues to this day.

On April 4, 1996, Excite went public with an initial offering of two million shares. Its offering was however overshadowed by its biggest rival, Yahoo!, which also went public at the same time. Excite's six founders became millionaires after the offering. In November 1996, America Online (AOL) agreed to make Excite its exclusive search and directory service, in return of a larger 20 percent share in Excite and sale of WebCrawler. In June 1997, Intuit, maker of Quicken and TurboTax, purchased a 19% stake in Excite and finalised a seven-year partnership deal. On October 16, 1997, Excite purchased Netbot, a comparison shopping agent. At the same time Intuit announced the launch of Excite Business & Investing. Later that year a deal was finalised with Ticketmaster to provide direct online ticketing. On March 31, 1998, Excite reported a net loss of approximately $30.2 million and according to its first quarter report it had only enough available capital to meet obligations through December. Content from Excite's portal was collated from over 100 different sources. Excite was the first portal to start offering free e-mail, and this step was followed by rivals Yahoo! and Lycos.

A November 1997 press release showed that there were about 11.8 million unique visitors to the Excite "network" during a 28-day period from September to October.

In December 1998, Yahoo! was in negotiations to purchase Excite for $5.5 billion to $6 billion. However, prompted by Kleiner Perkins, @Home Network's chairman and CEO, Thomas Jermoluk met with Excite's chairman and CEO George Bell on December 19, and Excite was subsequently acquired by @Home Network, on January 19, 1999. At this time, Excite was the sixth largest Internet portal by traffic. At one point, Microsoft was also interested in Excite, and had plans to merge it into its own MSN portal.

According to Steven Levy in his book In The Plex, in early 1997 two graduate students at Stanford University, Sergey Brin and Larry Page, decided that BackRub, the name of their research project that later became the search engine Google, was taking up time they should have been using to study. They went to Bell and offered it to him for $1 million, but Bell rejected the offer, and later threw Vinod Khosla, one of Excite's venture capitalists, out of his office after he had negotiated Brin and Page down to $750,000. In a 2014 podcast and later again to CNBC, then-CEO of Excite, George Bell, said that the deal fell apart because Larry Page wanted Excite's search technologies to be replaced by Google's, to which Bell did not agree on.

Excite@Home

The US$6.7 billion merger of Excite and @Home Network in 1999 (equivalent to $ billion in ) became one of the largest mergers of two Internet companies at the time. @Home's high-speed Internet services and existing portal were combined with Excite's search engine and portal, with a move towards personalised web portal content following the merger. The new company was named "Excite@Home" (the stock symbol and the company's name in regulatory filing records remained as "At Home Corporation" (ATHM)) and, six months after the merger, Tom Jermoluk stepped down as CEO of Excite@Home. Excite's George Bell, who was the president of the Excite division of @Home after the merger, became the new CEO of the combined Excite@Home, whilst Jermoluk remained the chairman of the board. The merger was billed as a "new media network for the 21st century."

Following the merger, the Excite division purchased iMall, as well as online greeting card company, Blue Mountain Arts. Excite also acquired photo sharing company Webshots. Excite furthermore paid for sponsorship of Infiniti Indy car driver Eddie Cheever, Jr., through the 2000 and 2001 racing seasons. However, the merger between Excite and @Home fell disastrously short of expectations. Online advertising revenue plummeted, while cable network ISP revenue continued to grow. On September 21, 2000, after stock value had dropped 90%, George Bell announced plans to step down as CEO within six months. On April 23, 2001, Excite@Home announced Patti S. Hart, the former CEO of Telocity, would become its third CEO in three years. In the same announcement, George Bell resigned and left the company completely. The company also reported first-quarter net loss of $61.6 million, compared with a loss of $4.6 million in the same period the prior year.

The search engine Magellan, which Excite had purchased in 1996, was closed down in May 2001.

On June 11, 2001, Excite@Home announced that it had raised $100 million in financing from Promethean Capital Management and Angelo Gordon & Co. Part of the deal was that the loan was repayable immediately if Excite@Home stock was delisted by NASDAQ. The loan, structured as a note convertible into shares of Excite, had an interest rate of zero. By August 20 of that year, Excite@Home had replaced its auditors Ernst & Young with PricewaterhouseCoopers. This triggered a demand from Promethean Capital Management and Angelo Gordon & Co for the immediate repayment of $50 million in debt. Furthermore, Cox Cable and Comcast announced that they would separate from Excite@Home by the first quarter of 2002.

On September 13, 2001, Excite@Home sold Blue Mountain Arts to American Greetings for less than 5% of what it had paid less than two years earlier. On October 1, 2001, Excite@Home filed for Chapter 11 bankruptcy protection with the U.S. Bankruptcy Court for the Northern District of California. The company's remaining 1,350 employees were laid off over the following months. As part of the agreement, @Home's national high-speed fiber network access would be sold back to AT&T Corporation. @Home Liquidating Trust became the successor company to Excite@Home, charged with the sale of all assets of the former company.

At the end of 2001, the Webshots assets were purchased by the company's founders for $2.4 million in cash from the Bankruptcy Court.

Despite the financial problems, the Excite network of sites continued to draw many visitors in the U.S., albeit behind AOL Time Warner, Microsoft and Yahoo!

Excite Network
During the collapse of Excite@Home, iWon, an Irvington, New York–based venture, had surreptitiously commenced the design of a new Excite website; iWon planned to acquire the Excite.com domain name and brand in the course of the bankruptcy proceedings. iWon eventually made a joint bid with Seattle's InfoSpace to purchase the domain name and brand. On November 28, 2001, the court accepted the bid and gave iWon less than three weeks to launch a new Excite portal. Bill Daugherty, iWon's founder and co-chief executive at the time, told The New York Times, "I feel like a guy who lived through a hurricane, got pounded and pounded and managed to survive when everyone else was destroyed. Suddenly you walk outside and because of the storm you have beachfront property. That's what Excite is to us."

On December 16, 2001, iWon launched the new Excite portal and transferred millions of Excite users to its new home. iWon changed its corporate name to Excite Network, and continued to operate Excite, iWon, and a third portal, MyWay. Outside of the United States, Excite Italia took control of portals in the United Kingdom, Germany, Spain, France, Italy, the Netherlands, Poland, Switzerland, and Austria. InfoSpace, for its part, owned and operated the web search function on Excite, with Excite's own database now depreciated and instead using Overture and Inktomi search results, along with DMOZ (Open Directory) for the directory and Dogpile metasearch for news results. This proved to be a short-sighted arrangement as searching became big business on the Internet in the ensuing years.

Acquisition by Ask Jeeves
Excite continued to operate until the Excite Network was acquired by Ask Jeeves (now Ask.com) in March 2004. Ask Jeeves promised to rejuvenate iWon and Excite, but was not able to. Ask Jeeves management became distracted, according to the East Bay Business Times, first by a search feature arms race with Google and Yahoo!, and then by its merger with Barry Diller's IAC/InterActiveCorp, announced in March 2005. "Hopefully, as we start to invest more and get the staff in place and some of the changes to the portal properties that we want, we hope to see (revenue) grow back in the latter half of the year," said Ask Jeeves CEO Steve Berkowitz during a conference call with analysts on April 27, 2005.

On May 20, 2005, Ask Jeeves made two announcements regarding the rejuvenation of the Excite brand. It first announced that it had acquired Excite Italia B.V. (the operator of the Excite portals in Europe), from Tiscali, S.p.A.; and, secondly, the company reported that it had reached a comprehensive settlement with InfoSpace regarding Excite in the United States, whereby Ask Jeeves and InfoSpace would share marketing costs and revenue from the Excite web search function. Regarding the acquisition, Ask Jeeves CEO, Steve Berkowitz, said, "We look forward to working with InfoSpace to enhance the search experience on Excite, now that our interests are aligned." On October 17, 2007, GOADV, a media company specialising in the generation of Internet "traffic", announced the completion of its acquisition of the European Excite group of companies.

Excite has never managed to recover back to its heyday popularity. It remains more relevant in Japan, however. Excite Japan, headquartered in Tokyo, was founded on August 4, 1997 in a partnership with Itochu. After Excite@Home's collapse, Itochu became majority shareholder of Excite Japan (90 percent).

Excite ended support for their webmail service on August 31, 2021. Those who already had accounts were offered to pay for a BlueTie Home e-mail account to keep their messages and contacts.

Other services

FreeLane by Excite
In a bid to compete against Internet Service Providers like NetZero and Juno Online, which offered free or low-cost dial-up access in the United States, Excite started offering its own "no-pay" service for private customers by partnering with 1stUp.com to create FreeLane by Excite: 1stUp would allow Excite customers to download software in order for them to be able to log-on to the Internet. The software would then rotate a series of sponsored banner advertisements on the user's computer while they surfed the Internet. 1stUp.com soon went out of business, and Excite switched to another partner named WorldShare, rebranding FreeLane as FreeLane version 2.0. As of March 1, 2001, FreeLane was discontinued.

Ticketsmate
Ticketsmate, in partnership with Excite, sells tickets to customers in the United States. The portal is essentially a ticket selling website where users can buy tickets and search through thousands of events and venues. The powerful search engine capabilities of the Excite server are used on this website to help the user search for tickets and events.

Excite Education (HigherEdu.com) 
Excite also has an education portal called HigherEdu.com that can be used by people to search for and apply for different degrees and online courses. The portal was originally called Excite Education and it once featured a list of thousands of educational institutes across America for prospective students to browse through and apply at but now features a much smaller list. The popularity of HigherEdu.com has declined along with the main Excite portal.

See also 
List of search engines

References

External links 
 

IAC (company)
1994 establishments in California
Companies that filed for Chapter 11 bankruptcy in 2001
Dot-com bubble
Digital marketing companies of the United States
American companies established in 1994
Internet properties established in 1995
Internet search engines
Metasearch engines
Multinational companies headquartered in the United States
Private equity portfolio companies
Software companies based in California
Technology companies established in 1994
Telecommunications companies established in 1994
Web 1.0
Web portals
Web service providers
Software companies of the United States